The Belgian Warmblood or  is a Belgian breed of warmblood sport horse. It is bred for dressage, for show-jumping and for three-day eventing. It is one of three Belgian warmblood breeds or stud-books, the others being the Zangersheide and the Belgian Sport Horse – to which it is quite similar.

History 

Breeding of the Belgian Warmblood was begun in 1937. It was initially bred as an agricultural riding horse, as in the northern or Flemish-speaking part of Belgium the breeding of saddle horses was restricted in order to protect breeding of the Belgian Draught or Brabant heavy horse. After this restriction was lifted in 1954, a breed society, the Fokvereninging van het Landbourijpaard, was formed; a stud-book was opened in 1955.

The foundation stock of the Belgian Warmblood included jumping horses from France and the Netherlands, as well as Hanoverians and Holsteiners from Germany.

The first stallion show for riding horses in Belgium took place, illegally, in 1953. Without native riding horses or all-purpose heavy warmbloods, Belgian breeders had to import stallions and mares.  Over the course of 50 years, the BWP accrued a mare base of over 3,500 broodmares and produced a significant number of international-quality show jumpers. In 2010, the BWP was ranked fourth in the FEI/WBFSH International Show Jumping standings, below only the KWPN-Dutch Warmblood, Selle Français, and Holsteiner stud books.

Characteristics 
As a warmblood horse, the Belgian Warmblood is characterized not by uniformity of coat color, appearance, or pedigree chart, but by uniformity of purpose. Like other warmbloods, Belgian Warmblood breeding horses are subjected to rigorous studbook selection.

The most reliable way to positively identify a Belgian Warmblood is by the brand on the left thigh. Belgian Warmblood foals receive this brand during their foal inspection, when they are given a passport and deemed free of obvious defects.

Between three and four years old, Belgian Warmblood stallions are presented to a jury in a Hengstenkeuring or stallion licensing test. The licensing test consists of a veterinary inspection, subjective evaluation of the stallion's conformation and jumping ability without a rider, and evaluation of the stallion's qualities under saddle. Stallions that do not achieve the desired marks in the licensing test are not eligible for the stud book.  To retain  status in the stud book, stallions must participate in competitions for young show-jumping horses called the "Classic Cycle". Mares take part in similar conformational evaluations, but judgement of a mare's qualities as a riding horse are elective.

The horses vary in size and substance; heights are usually in the range  at the withers.

Use 

Over the past 20 years, research has supported observations regarding the high heritability of jumping ability compared with that of dressage-quality gaits.

References 

 
Horse breeds
Horse breeds originating in Belgium
Warmbloods